Aprilov may refer to

Aprilov Point on the north coast of Greenwich Island, Antarctica
Aprilov National High School in Bulgaria
Aprilov (surname)